Abhijit Gangopadhyay is an Indian judge presently posted in the Calcutta High Court.
Gangopadhyay started his career as a West Bengal Civil Service (WBCS) officer. Then he resigned from the position and practiced as a State Advocate in the Calcutta High Court. In the High Court on 2 May 2018, he joined as an additional judge, and on 30 July 2020, he became a permanent judge.

Early life and education 
Abhijit Gangopadhyay's father was a lawyer. Abhijit Gangopadhyay did his schooling at Mitra Institution (Main), a Bengali-medium school in Kolkata, and passed out from the school in 1979. He studied law at Hazra Law College.

During the college life, Gangopadhyay acted in Bengali theatre. He was a member of a theatre group "Amitra Chanda". In 1986, he last acted in a play.

Career
Gangopadhyay started his career as a  West Bengal Civil Service (WBCS) A-grade officer. He was posted at North Dinajpur. Thereafter, he left the job and practiced as a State Advocate in the Calcutta High Court before the elevation in the bench. He joined in the High Court as an additional judge on 2 May 2018. He became a permanent judge on 30 July 2020.

Notable judgements

Since November 2021, Justice Gangopadhyay gave a series of directions of inquiry to the Central Bureau of Investigation (CBI) against West Bengal School Service Commission (WBSSC) for the alleged anomalies in recruitment process. He passed a number of orders against the officials of the School Service Commission, which lead to some political issues in West Bengal as well as Calcutta High Court. Gangopadhyay wrote a letter seeking intervention of the Chief Justice of India regarding the action of Division Bench in the cases of alleged irregularities of School Service Commission.

On 13 April 2022 the Bar Association, Calcutta High Court brought out a resolution to boycott the Court of Justice Gangopadhyay. All India Trinamool Congress law cell protested outside his courtroom and the then Governor Jagdeep Dhankhar wrote letter to the Chief Minister of West Bengal on this issue. On 18 May Justice Gangopadhyay directed former Education Minister Partha Chatterjee to appear before the CBI for the investigation of alleged teachers recruitment scam. On 17 May 2022, in another case he asked Paresh Chandra Adhikary, Minister of State, Department of School Education to be present before CBI over his connection in alleged illegal appointment of his daughter Ankita Adhikary. He also urged the Chief Minister and Hon'ble Governor to remove Adhikary from the post of minister.

In September 2022, Justice Gangopadhyay instructed West Bengal School Service Commission (WBSSC) to replace illegally appointed school teachers with eligible waiting list candidates.

References

External links 
 Interview of Abhijit Gangopahdyay by ABP Ananda (in Bengali)

1962 births
Living people
Indian judges
Judges of the Calcutta High Court
21st-century Indian judges
21st-century Indian lawyers